Kim Chul-Ho (Hangul: 김철호, Hanja: 金喆鎬) (born March 3, 1961 in Osan, Gyeonggi-do, South Korea) is a former boxer from South Korea.

In 1981, Kim became the WBC Super Flyweight champion with a 9-round KO win over Rafael Orono in San Cristóbal, Venezuela. He defended the belt five times, including a win over future multiple time world champion Jiro Watanabe, before losing it back to Rafael Orono in 1982.

External links
 

1961 births
World super-flyweight boxing champions
Super-flyweight boxers
World Boxing Council champions
Living people
South Korean male boxers
People from Osan
Sportspeople from Gyeonggi Province